Procyanidin B3 is a B type proanthocyanidin. Procyanidin B3 is a catechin dimer (catechin-(4α→8)-catechin).

Natural occurrences 
It can be found in red wine, in barley, in beer, in peach or in Jatropha macrantha, the Huanarpo Macho.

Health effects 
It has been identified as a hair-growth stimulant.

Chemical synthesis 
Molar equivalents of synthetic (2R,3S,4R or S)-leucocyanidin and (+)-catechin condense with exceptional rapidity at pH 5 under ambient conditions to give the all-trans-[4,8]- and [4,6]-bi-[(+)-catechins] (procyanidins B3, B6) the all-trans-[4,8:4,8]- and [4,8:4,6]-tri-[(+)-catechins] (procyanidin C2  and isomer).

See also 
 Phenolic content in wine

References 

Procyanidin dimers